The Southeast Asian shrew (Crocidura fuliginosa) is a species of mammal in the family Soricidae. It is found in Cambodia, India, China, Laos, Malaysia, Myanmar, Thailand, and Vietnam.

References

 Insectivore Specialist Group 1996.  Crocidura fuliginosa.   2006 IUCN Red List of Threatened Species.   Downloaded on 30 July 2007.

Crocidura
Mammals of Cambodia
Mammals of China
Mammals of Laos
Mammals of Malaysia
Mammals of Myanmar
Mammals of Thailand
Mammals of Vietnam
Mammals described in 1856
Taxa named by Edward Blyth
Taxonomy articles created by Polbot